The 2016–17 UC Davis Aggies men's basketball team represented the University of California, Davis during the 2016–17 NCAA Division I men's basketball season. The Aggies, led by sixth-year head coach Jim Les, played their home games at The Pavilion as members of the Big West Conference. They finished the season 23–13, 11–5 in Big West play to finish in second place. They defeated Cal Poly, Cal State Fullerton, and UC Irvine to win the Big West tournament. As a result, they earned the conference's automatic bid to the NCAA tournament as a No. 16 seed. They defeated North Carolina Central in the First Four before losing in the first round to Kansas.

Previous season 
The Aggies finished the 2015–16 season 11–19, 6–10 in Big West play to finish in fifth place. They lost in the first round of the Big West tournament to UC Santa Barbara.

Offseason

Departures

Incoming transfers

2016 recruiting class

2017 recruiting class

Roster

Schedule and results

|-
!colspan=9 style=| Non-conference regular season

|-
!colspan=9 style=| Big West Conference regular season

|-
!colspan=9 style=| Big West tournament

|-
!colspan=9 style=| NCAA tournament

References

UC Davis Aggies men's basketball seasons
UC Davis
UC Davis